Jagdgeschwader 103 (JG 103) was a Luftwaffe fighter-training-wing of World War II.

It was formed at Bad Aibling from Stab/Jagdfliegerschule 3 (JFS 3) on 7 December 1942 and was disbanded on 15 March 1945. Its commanding officers included Majors Herbert Ihlefeld and Major Hans von Hahn.

Bibliography

Fighter wings of the Luftwaffe 1933-1945
Military units and formations established in 1942
Military units and formations disestablished in 1945